Helfer is a surname. Notable people with the surname include:
Al Helfer (1911–1975), American sportscaster
Andy Helfer (born 1958), American comics writer
Erwin Helfer (born 1936), American pianist
Johann Wilhelm Helfer (1810–1840), Bohemian scientist
Laurence Helfer (born 1965), American lawyer
Ralph Helfer (born 1931), American animal behaviorist
Tricia Helfer (born 1974), Canadian actress

See also
Charles d'Helfer (1598–1661), French composer
Helfer, rank

German-language surnames